Sheep Mountain is a mountain in Custer County, Idaho, in the Boulder Mountains. At 3326m high, it is the 17th tallest peak with at least 500m of prominence in Idaho.

References 

Mountains of Idaho
Mountains of Custer County, Idaho